Ahmed Abdullahi may refer to:

 Ahmed Abdullahi (governor) (born 1945), Nigerian military administrator and governor
 Ahmed Abdullahi Gulleid (born 1953), Somali writer and researcher
 Ahmed Abdullahi (footballer) (born 2004), Nigerian footballer